The Online Privacy Alliance (or "OPA") was a cross-industry coalition of 81 e-commerce companies and associations. It formed in 1998 with the aim of providing a unified voice for companies in the Internet industry to contribute to the definition of privacy policy for the Internet.

History 
The Online Privacy Alliance began meeting formally in the spring of 1998. In June, the Alliance announced its creation, membership, mission and guidelines.

The group aimed to lead and support self-regulatory initiatives that "create an environment of trust and ... foster the protection of individuals' privacy online and in electronic commerce." It also aimed to provide a framework for debate and a forum for attracting companies engaged in e-commerce from the technology, telecommunications, publishing, entertainment, marketing, finance, and retail sectors.

The Principles of the Online Privacy Alliance were later used in writing the Principles later created by the Network Advertising Initiative or NAI.

Upon joining the Online Privacy Alliance, each member organization agreed that its policies for protecting individually identifiable information in an online or electronic commerce environment would meet the requirements of the OPA's guidelines, with customization and enhancement as appropriate to its own business or industry sector. The Online Privacy Alliance guidelines included provisions requiring members to notify users of data collection, to disclose privacy policies to users, to receive consent for data collection, and to securely store the data they collected. The Online Privacy Alliance did not monitor compliance with its guideline, instead it called for self-enforcement mechanisms.

While the initial count of membership organizations was 80, this eventually dwindled to around 30, as follows:

Member companies
Apple Computer
AT&T
AWS Convergence Technologies, Inc.
Boeing
Cendant
Dell
DoubleClick Inc.
eBay Inc.
EDS
Intuit
Microsoft
Nestlé
PricewaterhouseCoopers
Time Warner Inc.
Verizon Communications
The Walt Disney Company
WhenU
Zango

Member associations
American Advertising Federation
Association for Competitive Technology
Business Software Alliance
Association of National Advertisers
American Association of Advertising Agencies
Information Technology Association of America
Internet Alliance
Motion Picture Association of America
Online Publishers Association, now called Digital Content Next
TRUSTe
The United States Chamber of Commerce

The Alliance's last press release was issued in November 1999

References

External links

Defunct privacy organizations